Ramachandra Behera (born 1945) is an Odia story writer, novelist, dramatist and lecturer. He received the state sahitya academy award for his novel "Abhinayara Paridhi" in 1993.

Early life
Behera was born on 2 November 1945 at Bahartipura village near Ghatagaon, Kendujhar district, Odisha. He graduated from Ravenshaw College, Cuttack , M.A from Banaras Hindu University and Ph.D. (in English) from Utkal University. He joined as a lecturer in 1969 at Kendrapara college and retired as principal in 2005 and later he has been chaired the president of Odisha Sahitya Academy from 2010 to 2013.

Works
Behera has written stories, novels  and also some plays for All india Radio, Cuttack. His first collection of stoties titled " Dwitiya Smasana" marked his arrival. After that his some other collection followed like, Omkar Dhwani, Asthai Thikana, Gopapura etc.

Publications

Novels

Awards

References

Living people
1945 births
Writers from Odisha
Novelists from Odisha
Odia-language writers
Odia novelists
Odia short story writers
Odia dramatists and playwrights
Indian male novelists
Indian male short story writers
Recipients of the Sahitya Akademi Award in Odia
Recipients of the Odisha Sahitya Akademi Award
Recipients of the Atibadi Jagannath Das Award
20th-century Indian novelists
20th-century Indian short story writers
20th-century Indian male writers